Gert and Daisy is a 1959 British television sitcom. Starring the comedy act of the same name, the series aired on ITV, and was produced by Jack Hylton Productions for  Associated-Rediffusion Television. The series aired for six episodes. Created by Ted Willis, who also created Jack Warner's Dixon of Dock Green series, Gert and Daisy was not successful, apparently because it relied on scripts written by others rather than on the sisters' own writing skills. All the episodes still exist but the series has yet to appear on home video.

Premise
Gert and Daisy are two sisters who run a theatrical boarding house.

Cast
Elsie Waters as Gert
Doris Waters as Daisy
Hugh Paddick as Boris
Patsy Rowlands as Bonnie
Dudy Nimmo as Maureen
Jennifer Browne as Lulu
Julian D'Albie as Harry
Rosemary Scott as Violet

See also
The Larkins
Love and Kisses

References

External links
 

1959 British television series debuts
1959 British television series endings
1950s British comedy television series
ITV sitcoms
Black-and-white British television shows
English-language television shows